Moda Tower (formerly ODS Tower) is a 24-story office building in Portland, Oregon. At 308 ft. (94m), it is Portland's tenth-tallest building. Health insurance company Moda Health is the primary tenant of the high-rise.

History
Construction on the tower began in 1997 and was finished in 1999 at a cost of $34 million, with Zimmer Gunsul Frasca serving as the chief architectural firm for the project. The building was the culmination of many years of efforts to develop the site into a high-rise building, with the site formerly the home of the Chambers and Gerlinger buildings. Originally owned by the ODS Companies, it sold the building for $123 million in 2005 to Morrison CF-LLC. The building was sold for $129 million in 2013 to UBS and the name was changed to Moda after ODS Health Plans re-branded as Moda Health. In September 2018, the building was acquired by Unico Properties and American Realty Advisors for a reported $178 million.

Details
The main feature of the building's design is a floor plan that allows for six corner offices on each floor. The first four floors are devoted to city-mandated ground-floor retail (Nordstrom Rack, formerly Copeland Sports) and a parking garage. The parking garage has four levels, while the retail space totals . There is a  atrium on the ground floor at the building's main entrance to the retail areas. The curving facade along the eastern end of the building is supposed to follow a curve in the Willamette River. Moda Tower also has an observation deck on the roof. With  of leasable space, it is the tenth largest office building in Portland.

See also
Architecture of Portland, Oregon
List of tallest buildings in Portland, Oregon

References

External links 

Zimmer Gunsul Frasca
Ashforth Pacific

1999 establishments in Oregon
Office buildings completed in 1999
Skyscraper office buildings in Portland, Oregon